Peschel Island is the third-largest of the Bastian Islands in the Svalbard archipelago. It lies east of Wilhelm Island and northeast of Spitsbergen.

The wildlife consists largely of polar bears.

The Bastian Islands were discovered in 1867 by the Swedish-Norwegian polar explorer Nils Fredrik Rønnbeck, who was the first to sail around Spitsbergen. Most of the Bastian Islands were named during the First German North Polar Expedition in 1868, led by Carl Koldewey. This island is named after Oscar Peschel, a German geographer.

References

Islands of Svalbard